The Paton PG500R and Paton PG500RC are racing bikes of the Italian motorcycle manufacturer Paton, which debuted in the 500cc class of grand Prix motorcycle racing from 2000 until 2001, only participating in a few races, due to a lack of funds from the company and the difficulty of finding a sponsor.

Description
With the introduction of the PG500R in 2000, this bike used the new 54x54.4. engine measure for the first time, instead of the 56x50,6 ( bore x stroke ) configuration used in previous Paton bikes.

In 2000, the PG500R used a double beam aluminum frame and a swingarm from "Paton LM Gianetti" whilst in 2001, the PG500RC switched to a "Paton Cagiva V 594 in Anticorodal material" and also changing the livery slightly. The tank and the tail inspired by the Paton C10/5 were no longer used, but a more rounded tank and a higher tail were used instead.

The bikes also differ from the previous model, mainly due to the absence of the radiator slits and the use of a lower fairing, which is wider and laps both wheels, while the fairing is higher and more protective.

2000
Despite the death of Roberto Pattoni's father Giuseppe Pattoni 1999, Roberto continued to develop the teams racing motorbikes, but the team would score only one point in the 2000 Grand Prix motorcycle racing season as a wildcard entry, when Paolo Tessari finished fifteenth at the Sachsenring on the teams PG500R machine.

2001
With the arrival of the 4 stroke and highly expensive MotoGP, which allowed for a double capacity (1000cc) and with the clear intent to push for the 2 stroke retirement by the FIM, Roberto Pattoni and his team decided to pull out of grand prix motorcycle racing after the 2001 season, mainly due to the ever rising costs in the sport which were needed to create a new 1000cc 4-stroke MotoGP bike, that the Paton team did not have the budget for. During this season, Paton was sponsored by Slovnaft thanks to the wildcard rider Vladimír Častka, but failed to score any points due to the retirement of  Shaun Geronimi at the 2001 Czech Republic motorcycle Grand Prix, the two DNQ's of Vladimír Častka at the 2001 Spanish motorcycle Grand Prix and 2001 Italian motorcycle Grand Prix and the withdrawal of Sébastien Gimbert from the 2001 British motorcycle Grand Prix after he crashed 20 minutes into the first practice session and broke his ankle.

Specifications

See also 

Honda NSR500
Aprilia RSW-2 500
Cagiva C593
Suzuki RGV500
Yamaha YZR500
Sabre V4

References

Grand Prix motorcycles
Motorcycles introduced in 2000
Two-stroke motorcycles